Zographus nitidus is a species of beetle in the family Cerambycidae. It was described by Per Olof Christopher Aurivillius in 1914, originally Quimalanca. It is known from Uganda and the Democratic Republic of the Congo.

References

Sternotomini
Beetles described in 1914